Brayan Alexis Angulo León (born 2 November 1989) is a Colombian professional footballer who plays as a left-back for Liga MX club Toluca.

Club career
Born in Cali, Valle del Cauca, Angulo began his career at América de Cali where he caught the eye of Spanish investors, rumored to be working for Real Betis. His work permit to play in La Liga did not go through, and he eventually signed with Portugal's Boavista F.C. in July 2007 even though he was only certified in February of the following year, appearing regularly for the northerners as they were finally relegated due to irregularities.

After starting the 2008–09 season without a team, Angulo eventually returned to Portugal in January 2009, playing with fellow Primeira Liga club Leixões S.C. until the end of the campaign. In June, he was transferred to Deportivo de La Coruña on a season-long loan move, with the Galicians having an option to make the move permanent afterwards – the fee was reportedly €1 million for 60% of his rights and €100,000 for the loan period.

In a season where Deportivo finished in tenth position in the top level, both Angulo and starter Filipe Luís suffered serious injuries which put them out of action for several months, with the former failing to manage one single official appearance whatsoever. In late July 2010 he was bought permanently from Leixões, being immediately loaned to another side in Spain, Rayo Vallecano in Segunda División.

On 9 July 2012, after one year in the lower leagues with CD Atlético Baleares, Angulo moved straight into the top level, penning a three-year contract with Granada CF. He made his debut in the top flight on 30 September, coming on as a 67th-minute substitute for Fabián Orellana in a 2–1 home win against RC Celta de Vigo; his first goal in the competition came on 5 January of the following year, but in a 1–2 home loss to Valencia CF.

In 2013–14, after Guilherme Siqueira left for S.L. Benfica, Angulo became undisputed first choice for Lucas Alcaraz' team. On 20 June 2014, he joined First Professional Football League (Bulgaria) club PFC Ludogorets Razgrad. In the summer of 2017 Angulo signed a contract with Liga MX club Puebla.

International career
Angulo was first called up by Colombia in November 2014, by national team coach José Pekerman. He remained an unused substitute in the 2–1 away win against the United States on the 14th, but played ten minutes four days later with Slovenia after replacing Juan Cuadrado (also away, 1–0 success).

Club statistics

Honours
Individual
Liga MX All-Star: 2022

References

External links

1989 births
Living people
Footballers from Cali
Colombian footballers
Association football defenders
Categoría Primera A players
América de Cali footballers
Primeira Liga players
Boavista F.C. players
Leixões S.C. players
La Liga players
Segunda División players
Segunda División B players
Deportivo de La Coruña players
Rayo Vallecano players
CD Atlético Baleares footballers
Granada CF footballers
First Professional Football League (Bulgaria) players
PFC Ludogorets Razgrad II players
PFC Ludogorets Razgrad players
Liga MX players
Chiapas F.C. footballers
Club Puebla players
Club Tijuana footballers
Deportivo Toluca F.C. players
Colombia international footballers
Colombian expatriate footballers
Expatriate footballers in Portugal
Expatriate footballers in Spain
Expatriate footballers in Bulgaria
Expatriate footballers in Mexico
Colombian expatriate sportspeople in Portugal
Colombian expatriate sportspeople in Spain
Colombian expatriate sportspeople in Mexico